Below are the squads for the Football at the 1999 Southeast Asian Games, hosted by Philippine, which took place between 1 and 14 December 1999.

Group A

Laos 
Coach: Songphu Phongsa

Myanmar 
Coach:

Philippines 
Coach:

Thailand 
Coach:   Peter Withe

Vietnam 
Coach:  Alfred Riedl

Group B

Brunei 
Coach:  Mick Jones

Cambodia 
Coach:

Indonesia
Coach:  Bernhard Schumm

Malaysia
Coach: Abdul Rahman Ibrahim

Singapore
Coach: Vincent Subramaniam

External links
 
 

1999 Southeast Asian Games